The Fort Buford Stage Road, in or near Washburn, North Dakota in McLean County, North Dakota was listed on the National Register of Historic Places in 2019.

It presumably went to Fort Buford, in the Dakota Territory.

References

Roads and trails on the National Register of Historic Places in North Dakota
National Register of Historic Places in McLean County, North Dakota
Transportation in McLean County, North Dakota
Military roads
Trails and roads in the American Old West